The Athens Mass Transit System is the largest mass transit system of Greece. The system is run by the OASA S.A. organisation and serves Athens Urban Area and the Athens Metropolitan Area (most of the Region of Attica without the island section).

Companies
As of July 2011, the Athens Mass Transit System consists of:

 OSY S.A.
 Βus network (internal combustion engine buses and trolleybuses).
 STASY S.A.
 The Athens Tram system
 The Athens Metro with 3 lines.
Hellenic Train S.A.
 The Athens Suburban Railway, using Hellenic Railways Organisation (OSE) lines, operated by Hellenic Train S.A. under the Proastiakos brand. The section between Piraeus, Magoula and Koropi is regarded as the urban part.

In March 2011, with the Greek Government Law 3920 Attiko Metro Operational Company (AMEL S.A.) absorbed Athens-Piraeus Electric Railways S.A. and TRAM S.A. and was renamed "STASY S.A.". Also ETHEL S.A. absorbed ILPAP S.A. and was renamed as "OSY S.A.". The mergers were officially announced on June 10, 2011. While mergers at the top management level took place quickly, integration of the former companies at operations and support level proceeds slowly.

OSY and STASY are wholly owned by OASA. Hellenic Train (for the urban part of the Athens Suburban Railway) is coordinated by Athens Urban Transport Organisation (Organismos Astikon Syngoinonion Athinon - OASA), a state-owned company.

ISAP, ETHEL and ILPAP were wholly owned by OASA. AMEL and Tram S.A. until June 2011 were subsidiaries of Attiko Metro S.A., a company that is currently wholly owned by the Greek government.

Hellenic Train S.A., which absorbed the former Proastiakos S.A. in 2007, became independent of the OSE group in 2008 and is now a separate private company.

OASA regularly conducts street photography and videography competitions both in black-and-white and in colour for photos taken while inside its means of transport.

Fare collection system 
Up until the 80s, fare collectors were commonplace in all means of mass transport in Athens. Their replacement was a money box placed at the front end of the vehicles, next to the driver, where passengers would deposit their fare in cash, usually coinage. A decade later, they were replaced with validation machines and paper tickets. The end of the single-use paper ticket came in 2017, when it was succeeded by the ATH.ENA electronic stored-value cards and tickets (stylized as ATH.ENA CARD and ATH.ENA TICKET respectively). Tickets are now rechargeable and can be loaded with up to 5-day unlimited ticket, but not with long term fare products, discount tickets (support discontinued in January 2019) or monetary value. Cards (personalised and anonymised) can hold all fare types and a maximum of €50, with the exception of discount tickets which are tied to personalised cards.

Tickets and cards are validated contaclessly in validation machines inside buses, trolleybuses and trams. Suburban railway trains and the Athens Metro utilize turnstiles.

The ATH.ENA ticket and ATH.ENA card can be used in suburban railway trains starting from Magoula or Dhekelia and onwards.

Depots

Metro
Eirini depot (Line 1)
Sepolia depot (Lines 2 & 3)
Eleonas depot (Lines 2 & 3)

Tram
Elliniko depot

Trolleybus
Attiki depot (Closed for trolleybuses. Used by maintenance vehicles only)
Gazi depot (Closed between 2011 and 2014. Converted to an event venue)
Kokkinos Mylos depot
Neo Faliro depot (Closed)
Rouf depot (Opened in 2011 to gradually replace Attiki, Neo Faliro and Gazi)

Bus
Agios Dimitrios depot
Ano Liosia depot
Anthousa depot
Elliniko depot (Closed in 2018 to make space for the Hellenikon Metropolitan Park)
Petrou Ralli depot
Rentis depot
Thriaseio depot (Used only for laying up retired buses)
Votanikos depot

Gallery

See also
 Athens Railway Station
 List of bus routes in Athens

References

External links

OASA companies established in 2011
  O.A.S.A. - Athens Urban Transport Organisation
 STASY S.A.
 OSY S.A.

Non-OASA companies
  TrainOSE suburban services
  O.S.E. - Hellenic Railways Organisation S.A.
  Hellenic Ministry of Transportation and Communications

Intermodal transport authorities
Rail transport in Attica